This was the first edition of the tournament.

Ivan and Matej Sabanov won the title after defeating Denys Molchanov and Aleksandr Nedovyesov 6–4, 2–6, [12–10] in the final.

Seeds

Draw

References

External links
 Main draw

Platzmann-Sauerland Open - Doubles